Darko Nestorović (born 4 April 1965) is a Bosnian professional football manager and former player.

Playing career
Born in Kakanj, SR Bosnia and Herzegovina, Nestorović played for Čelik Zenica, Rad and Rijeka in the former SFR Yugoslavia.
After Rijeka and the breakup of Yugoslavia, he played abroad for Panserraikos in the Greek First Division, FC Ham-Kam(Hamar) in the first league of Norway , FC Golden Hong-Kong in the first league of China, FC Umea in the first league of Sweden. In the first league of Serbia and Montenegro, he played for FC Spartak (Subotica) and FC Mogren (Budva). In his playing career, he was a representative of all national teams of Bosnia and Herzegovina and a youth representative of Yugoslavia in the generation of Darko Pančev, Dragan Piksi Stojković, Mitar Mrkela, Dika Stojanović, and with that generation he qualified for the European Championship. He also remained as FC Celik's all-time top scorer. He played in the UEFA Cup with FC Rad (Belgrade) and was the scorer in a 2-1 victory over FC Olympiakos (Greece) in Belgrade. Abroad, he was a member of the Hong Kong national team.

Managerial career
After ending his playing career, Nestorović stayed in football as an professional manager, starting off at Radnik Bijeljina. After Radnika, he managed Drina Zvornik then Rudar Prijedor.
With Rudar Prijedor, Nestorović achieved the greatest success in the history of the club. In three seasons, he introduced a team from the second league to the first league, and the following year to the premier league of Bosnia and Herzegovina. With the same players, he was in the middle of the Premier League table. He was twice chosen as the best coach of the year in the selection of Sporski Žurnal, as well as by his fellow coaches. Then he managed Sloboda Mrkonjić Grad, Radnik Bijeljina, who he promoted to the Bosnian Premier League by winning the 2011–12 First League of RS.
When he lead FR Radnik Bijeljina, Darko was coach to the Bosnia and Herzegovina U23 Olympic national team, Sutjeska Foča and Rudar, before becoming head coach of the Bosnia and Herzegovina U21 national team on 27 December 2014. Nestorović stayed as head coach until 10 mart 2017.

He then became manager of Kuwait Premier League club Al-Arabi on 13 August 2017, working alongside Kuwaiti manager Mohammed Ebrahim Hajeyah. On 5 September 2018, he became the new manager of newly promoted Bosnian Premier League club Zvijzeda 09.
Nestorović took over the team that was last in the standings with only three points and that everyone had already seen in the second league. In a very short period, he stabilized the team and with five consecutive victories in the championship led the team to the sixth place in the table and saved relegation.Even after making decent results with the club, Nestorović decided to leave Zvijezda on 11 March 2019. On 6 September 2019, he returned to Al-Arabi. Nestorović took over Al Arabi, who were also last in the Kuwait First League table and were in a very difficult situation. He eventually managed to lead the team to third place and also played with Al Arabi in the final of the Prince Cup and was first in the League Cup. Al Arabi played the most beautiful football in Kuwait during that period.

Nestorović once again became manager of Radnik Bijeljina on 24 November 2020. On 16 April 2021, he decided to resign as manager of Radnik for private reasons. On 14 June 2021, Darko became the coach of Kazma, another club in the Kuwait Premier League.
With Kazma, Nestorović was the autumn champion of the Kuwait First League and played in the semi-finals of the Emir Cup. After twenty years, Kazma was at the top of Kuwaiti football.During that period of his stay in Kazma, Nestorović was a candidate for the selector of the National Team of Kuwait.

Honours

Manager
Rudar Prijedor
 Second League of RS: 2007-08

Rudar Prijedor
 First League of RS: 2008–09

Radnik Bijeljina
 First League of RS: 2011–12

References

External links
 

1965 births
Living people
People from Kakanj
Association football forwards
Yugoslav footballers
Bosnia and Herzegovina footballers
NK Čelik Zenica players
FK Rad players
HNK Rijeka players
Panserraikos F.C. players
Hamarkameratene players
Yugoslav First League players
Super League Greece players
Eliteserien players
Yugoslav expatriate footballers
Expatriate footballers in Greece
Yugoslav expatriate sportspeople in Greece
Bosnia and Herzegovina expatriate footballers
Expatriate footballers in Norway
Bosnia and Herzegovina expatriate sportspeople in Norway
Bosnia and Herzegovina football managers
FK Drina Zvornik managers
FK Rudar Prijedor managers
FK Sloboda Mrkonjić Grad managers
FK Radnik Bijeljina managers
Bosnia and Herzegovina national under-21 football team managers
Al-Arabi SC (Kuwait) managers
Kazma SC managers
FK Zvijezda 09 managers
Premier League of Bosnia and Herzegovina managers
Kuwait Premier League managers
Bosnia and Herzegovina expatriate football managers
Expatriate football managers in Kuwait
Bosnia and Herzegovina expatriate sportspeople in Kuwait